Steven Bernstein may refer to:

*Steven Bernstein (cinematographer) (active from 1986), American cinematographer
Steven Bernstein (musician) (born 1961), American trumpeter
Steven "Jesse" Bernstein (1950–1991), American poet